Jostein Flo (born 3 October 1964) is a Norwegian former footballer who played as a forward. Usually a centre-forward or striker, he was known for his physical playing style and aerial dominance, and was also capable of playing on the right flank. He was most recently Director of Football in Strømsgodset.

Career
At club level, Flo usually played as a centre-forward. For the Norwegian national team, he also acted as a target man, but instead played right winger, and was instrumental for the tactics applied by former Norway coach Egil Olsen. Playing a characteristic 4–5–1 formation, the left back would often hit long crosses to Flo, who in turn would head the ball to either one of the central midfielders or to the striker. This was known as the Flo Pass.

He played for Stryn, Sogndal, Molde F.K., Lierse S.K., Sheffield United F.C. and Strømsgodset I.F. He was capped 53 times, and scored 11 goals for the Norwegian national team and was part of his country's squads at the 1994 and 1998 FIFA World Cups. Perhaps his most famous appearance for the national side was the World Cup match against Brazil on 23 June 1998, when he came on as a late substitute and contributed heavily to turning a 0–1 deficit to a last-gasp 2–1 upset of the reigning World Cup champions.

Flo retired after the 2002 season, having scored 120 goals in 184 games for Strømsgodset. After his playing career, he worked with marketing for the club before he filled the role of executive director from October 2004 to January 2006. He later became the director of football of Strømsgodset.

Personal life
Flo is from a family of footballers; he is the younger brother of Kjell Rune Flo, who also played for Molde, and the older brother of Tore André Flo. who played for Chelsea and Rangers, and Jarle Flo who played for Norwegian Sogndal. Håvard Flo (who played for Sogndal, AGF, SV Werder Bremen, and Wolverhampton Wanderers F.C.) is his cousin. In addition, Ulrik Flo is his nephew.

Jostein Flo was a decent high jumper in his younger days, and has a personal best jump of 2.06 metres from 1983 (2.08 m indoor from 1987).

Career statistics

Club

References

1964 births
Living people
People from Stryn
Association football forwards
Norwegian footballers
Norway international footballers
Stryn TIL players
Lierse S.K. players
Sheffield United F.C. players
Molde FK players
Sogndal Fotball players
Strømsgodset Toppfotball players
1994 FIFA World Cup players
1998 FIFA World Cup players
Kniksen Award winners
Premier League players
Belgian Pro League players
Eliteserien players
Norwegian First Division players
Norwegian expatriate footballers
Expatriate footballers in Belgium
Expatriate footballers in England
Norwegian expatriate sportspeople in Belgium
Norwegian expatriate sportspeople in England
Strømsgodset Toppfotball non-playing staff
Norwegian sports executives and administrators
Flo family